Scott County is a county located in the U.S. state of Iowa. As of the 2020 census, the population was 174,669, making it the third-most populous county in Iowa. The county seat is Davenport.

Scott County is included in the Davenport–Moline-Rock Island, IA–IL Metropolitan Statistical Area.

History

The first American settlement in the area now known as Scott County was Clark's Ferry or Clark's Landing (now Buffalo) in 1833. Other early towns included Davenport (now the county seat and largest city) and the town of Rockingham (which ceased to exist in 1847). The area was fully surveyed in 1837, and the county was established by the Wisconsin territorial legislature in that same year. Scott County is named for General Winfield Scott, who was the presiding officer at the signing of the peace treaty ending the Black Hawk War.

By 1900 the population of the county was 51,500, and by 1950 it was over 100,000. Scott County now comprises part of the Quad City region, which includes the cities of Davenport and Bettendorf (in Iowa) and Rock Island, Moline and East Moline (in Illinois).

The present Scott County Courthouse was completed in 1955 and expanded along with the jail in 2007. The old section of the Scott County Jail was listed on the National Register of Historic Places in 1983. The courthouse was included as a contributing property in the Davenport Downtown Commercial Historic District in 2020.

Geography
The county seat is the city of Davenport. Part of the Upper Mississippi River National Wildlife and Fish Refuge is located within the county.

Major highways

 Interstate 74
 Interstate 80
 Interstate 280
 U.S. Highway 6
 U.S. Highway 61
 U.S. Highway 67
 Iowa Highway 22
 Iowa Highway 130

Transit
 Bettendorf Transit
 Davenport Citibus
 List of intercity bus stops in Iowa

Adjacent counties
Clinton County (north)
Rock Island County, Illinois (east and south)
Muscatine County (southwest)
Cedar County (northwest)

Demographics

The US Census Bureau estimated Scott County's population at 170,385 in 2013, fourth fastest-growing out of Iowa's 99 counties after Dallas County, a western suburb of Des Moines: Johnson, Polk, followed by Warren County being the top five.

2020 census
There were 77,771 housing units, of which 71,628 were occupied.

2010 census
There were 71,835 housing units, of which 66,765 were occupied.

2000 census

At the 2000 census there were 158,668 people, 62,334 households, and 41,888 families in the county. There were 65,649 housing units at an average density of 143 per square mile (55/km2). The racial makeup of the county was 88.54% White, 6.11% Black or African American, 0.32% Native American, 1.58% Asian, 0.02% Pacific Islander, 1.64% from other races, and 1.80% from two or more races. 4.06%. were Hispanic or Latino of any race.

Of the 62,334 households, 33.20% had children under the age of 18 living with them, 52.30% were married couples living together, 11.40% had a female householder with no husband present, and 32.80% were non-families. 26.90% of households were one person and 9.00% were one person aged 65 or older. The average household size was 2.49 and the average family size was 3.04.

The age distribution was 26.50% under the age of 18, 9.30% from 18 to 24, 29.40% from 25 to 44, 23.00% from 45 to 64, and 11.80% 65 or older. The median age was 35 years. For every 100 females, there were 95.80 males. For every 100 females age 18 and over, there were 92.50 males.

The median household income was $42,701 and the median family income was $52,045. Males had a median income of $38,985 versus $25,456 for females. The per capita income for the county was $21,310. About 7.70% of families and 10.50% of the population were below the poverty line, including 13.70% of those under age 18 and 5.80% of those age 65 or over.

Communities

Cities

Bettendorf
Blue Grass
Buffalo
Davenport
Dixon
Donahue
Durant
Eldridge
LeClaire
Long Grove
Maysville
McCausland
New Liberty
Panorama Park
Princeton
Riverdale
Walcott

Census-designated places
Argo
Big Rock
Park View
Plainview

Other unincorporated communities
Desmond Acres

Townships

Allens Grove
Blue Grass
Buffalo
Butler
Cleona
Davenport (City)
Hickory Grove
LeClaire
Liberty
Lincoln
Pleasant Valley
Princeton
Sheridan
Winfield

Former township
Rockingham

Population ranking
The population ranking of the following table is based on the 2020 census of Scott County.

† county seat

Politics
For most of its history, Scott County was primarily a Republican county. From 1880 to 1984, it only supported a Democrat for president nine times, six of which were national Democratic landslides. In more recent elections, the county has become consistently Democratic in presidential elections like many other midsize urban counties nationwide, with the party's candidates winning the county in every presidential election from 1988 on. Despite these victories, their margins of victory have not been as wide as in many other counties of similar composition, especially in 2016 when Hillary Clinton only won the county by 1,291 votes. However, in the 2022 elections, Republicans swept Scott County, with the county voting for the Republican candidates for all statewide offices, as well as for Republican Mariannette Miller-Meeks for  U.S. House of Representatives. Notably, Republican governor Kim Reynolds won the county with a margin of over 10 points.

Education
Public school districts in Scott County include:  
Bettendorf Community School District, Bettendorf
Calamus–Wheatland Community School District, Wheatland
Davenport Community School District, Davenport
Durant Community School District, Durant
North Scott Community School District, Eldridge
Pleasant Valley Community School District, Riverdale, Bettendorf, LeClaire

Higher education institutions
Scott Community College is located in Riverdale
Saint Ambrose University is located in Davenport

See also

National Register of Historic Places listings in Scott County, Iowa
Upper Mississippi River National Wildlife and Fish Refuge

Notes

References

External links

Scott County, Iowa
Scott County Library System

 
1837 establishments in Wisconsin Territory
Populated places established in 1837
Quad Cities
Iowa counties on the Mississippi River